DGE or Dge may refer to:
 Dual Gateway Exchange, a Crypto exchange allowing for both traditional trading and futures on one platform
 Delhi Gurgaon Expressway, an expressway in India
 Diccionario Griego-Español
 Dirección General de Estadística, the General Directorate of Statistics, a Mexican government agency founded in 1882 and merged into its successor agency INEGI in 1983
 Directeur général des élections du Québec
 Dynamic stochastic general equilibrium, a branch of applied general equilibrium theory in contemporary macroeconomics
 Denaturing gel electrophoresis, a DNA banding pattern-based typing method
 Diglycidyl ether, an industrial chemical
 Mudgee Airport, IATA airport code "DGE"